Anne Wingate (September 4, 1943 – September 2, 2021) was a mystery, fantasy, and romance writer who lived in Salt Lake City, Utah. She owned two publishing houses (including one with her husband), and published works under her own name as well as the pseudonyms Lee Martin and Martha G. Webb. She died on September 2, 2021, in Salt Lake City.

Biography
Wingate was born on September 4, 1943, as Martha Anne Guice in Savannah, Georgia, She grew up as a member of the Disciples of Christ Church, and is an adult convert to the Church of Jesus Christ of Latter-day Saints. Prior to becoming a writer, she worked as a crime scene investigator.

In January 2006, Wingate was brought into the media spotlight because her adopted daughter, Alicia Wingate, was killed along with her boyfriend in a police shootout in Kansas. Her daughter was being sought in connection with the murder of man in Utah. Wingate stated that—on the basis of published information about the crime—she is certain that Alicia would have been quickly exonerated if the case had made it to court.

She died on September 2, 2021, in Salt Lake City.

Career
Most of her mysteries are set somewhere within Texas. Her LDS beliefs sometime shows in her works. Wingate is partner with her husband, Thomas Russell Wingate, in Wingate & Wingate, Writers. She also owns Live Oak House, an e-publishing company. Through Live Oak House, she has published other writers, her own fantasies and romances, and works by some of her children.  She and her husband are part-time Project Coordinators of the Project Gutenberg Literary Archive Foundation, the not-for-profit corporation that receives and processes donations to Project Gutenberg.

In addition to works published under her own name, Wingate writes under the pseudonyms Lee Martin and Martha G. Webb.

Bibliography

Novels
Darling Corey's Dead (as Martha G. Webb, 1984), Walker & Company, 
A White Male Running (as Martha G. Webb, 1985), Walker & Company, 
Even Cops' Daughters (as Martha G. Webb, 1986), Walker & Company,

Deb Ralston Mystery series
Follows an LDS detective in Fort Worth, Texas.
Too Sane a Murder (as Lee Martin, 1984), St. Martin's Press, 
A Conspiracy of Strangers (as Lee Martin, 1986), St. Martin's Press, 
Murder at the Blue Owl (as Lee Martin, 1988), St. Martin's Press, 
Hal's Own Murder Case (as Lee Martin, 1988), St. Martin's Press, 
Death Warmed Over (as Lee Martin, 1988), St. Martin's Press, 
Deficit Ending (as Lee Martin, 1990), St. Martin's Press, 
The Mensa Murders (as Lee Martin, 1991), St. Martin's Press, 
Hacker (as Lee Martin, 1992), St. Martin's Press, 
Inherited Murder (as Lee Martin, 1994), St. Martin's Press, 
The Day That Dusty Died (as Lee Martin, 1994), St. Martin's Press, 
Bird in a Cage (as Lee Martin, 1995), St. Martin's Press, 
Genealogy of Murder (as Lee Martin, 1996), St. Martin's Press, 
The Thursday Club (as Lee Martin, 1997), St. Martin's Press,

Mark Shigata Mystery series
Set in Bayport, Texas.
Death by Deception (1988), Walker & Company, 
The Eye of Anna (1989), Walker & Company, 
The Buzzards Must Also Be Fed (1991), Walker & Company, 
Exception to Murder (1992), Walker & Company, 
Yakuza, Go Home! (1993), Walker & Company,

Short fiction
"'The Twelve Dancing Princesses' Revisited" in Once Upon a Crime (1998), Berkley Books, 
"Evelyn Lying There" in Women of Mystery II (1994), Berkley Books,

Non-fiction
Scene of the Crime: A Writer's Guide to Crime-Scene Investigations (1992), Writer's Digest Books, 
Amateur Detectives: A Writer's Guide to How Private Citizens Solve Criminal Cases (1996), Writer's Digest Books, 

Sources:

References

External links
Review of Death by Deception and The Buzzards Must Also Be Fed
Review of Scene of the Crime

1943 births
2021 deaths
20th-century American novelists
Converts to Mormonism from Restoration Movement denominations
American Latter Day Saints
American mystery writers
Writers from Salt Lake City
American women novelists
Women mystery writers
Novelists from Utah
20th-century American women writers
21st-century American women